Motherless Brooklyn can refer to:
Motherless Brooklyn (novel), 1999 novel by Jonathan Lethem
Motherless Brooklyn (film), 2019 film based on the novel